Eiden is an abbreviation for Eizan Electric Railway.

Other uses:
 Edmund Eiden (1921–2017), American football player
 Max Eiden (1910–1954), American football player, and coach of football and basketball